William Delany "Swack" Swackhamer (August 18, 1914 – July 10, 2008), was an American politician who was a Democratic member of the Nevada General Assembly from 1946 to 1972. He was Speaker of the Assembly in 1957, 1958, 1965, and 1966. From 1967 to 1968, he served as Majority Leader of the Assembly. From 1973 to 1987, he served as Secretary of State of Nevada. He was a veteran of World War II with the United States Army Air Forces. He died after a stroke in 2008.

References

1914 births
2008 deaths
Secretaries of State of Nevada
Speakers of the Nevada Assembly
Democratic Party members of the Nevada Assembly
20th-century American politicians
People from Winnemucca, Nevada